Liang Chong (born January 29, 1980, in Guangzhou, Guangdong) is a Chinese chess Grandmaster.

In 2004, he became China's 16th Grandmaster.

Grandmaster title
Chong gained the GM title in July 2004.

He achieved his first GM norm at the 3rd S.T. Lee Cup Open Tournament in September 1996 scoring 6/10. His second GM norm wasn't achieved until another 5 years in April 2001 at the World Championship Zonal 3.3 in Handan with a score 8/13. His third norm was achieved in September 2003 at the Chinese Team Chess Championship in Tianjin with a score of 6.5/10.

National team
He participated for the China national chess team at the 34th Chess Olympiad (2000) with an overall record of 3 games played (+1, =1, -1); one World Men's Team Chess Championship (2005) with an overall record of 1 game played (+1, =0, -0); and one Men's Asian Team Chess Championships (1999) with an overall record of 5 games played (+2, =2, -1) for the China B team.

World Championship
In 1999 he managed to qualify for the FIDE World Chess Championship Knockout Tournament in Las Vegas, but was beaten in the first round by Goran Dizdar. At the 2001-2 WCC Knockout Tournament in Moscow, he was again defeated in the first round (by Alexander Motylev).

University
In March 2008 he competed at the 10th World University Chess Championship tournament in Novokuznetsk where he came 8th.

China Chess League
Liang Chong plays for China Mobile Group Chongqing Company Ltd chess club in the China Chess League (CCL).

See also
Chess in China

References

External links
Liang Chong - New In Chess. NICBase Online.
FIDE Chess Player card - Individual Calculations

Chessmetrics Career Ratings for Liang Chong
Elo rating with world rankings and historical development since 1990 (benoni.de/schach/elo) for Liang Chong

1980 births
Living people
Chess grandmasters
Chess Olympiad competitors
Chess players from Guangzhou